Boon is a trick-taking card game, based on the German card game Sheepshead. It was released in 2015. Though the rules of Boon are analogous to those in the game Sheepshead, Boon uses a specialized deck which corresponds directly to the rules of the game. This is different than Sheepshead, which is played with 32 cards from the Standard 52-card deck. Boon can be played with three or four players.

Objective
To win the game, you must be the player with the most victory cards by the time another player is eliminated. Each game is played in a successive series of rounds, after which victory cards are exchanged.

Cards 
There are 32 gameplay cards that come in four suits, as denoted by their color (blue, green, red, and gold).

In total, there are:
 6 blue cards (ranks 1 - 6)
 6 green cards (ranks 1 - 6)
 6 red cards (ranks 1 - 6)
 14 gold Trump cards (ranks 1 - 14)
Each card has its rank in the corner and its given point value marked in the center. Points range from 0 - 11. Note that there's not a direct correlation between rank and points - the highest ranked cards in the game are not worth the most points.

In addition to gameplay cards, there are also 20 Victory Cards in the deck.

Game Setup 
At the start of the game, separate the victory cards from the gameplay cards. Provide each player with 5 Victory Cards.

Dealing the Cards 
At the start of a round, deal out all the remaining gameplay cards face down as follows:

For 3-Player Games:
 First remove the "Green 1" and "Red 1" cards from the deck. Then deal nine cards to each player and put another three cards in a separate pile called the Boon.
For 4-Player Games:
 Deal seven cards to each player and put another four cards in a separate pile called the Boon. After each round, the dealer role shifts to the next clockwise player.

What is the Boon? 
The Boon is a pile of cards a player may use to gain an advantage and improve his hand. When a player takes the Boon, he becomes a solo player against every- one else. For the rest of the round, all other players are united on a defensive team against the solo player who took the Boon.

Taking the Boon 
After the cards are dealt, the player to the left of the dealer has the choice to take the Boon and use its cards. Note that you don't get to see the cards in the Boon until after you've decided to take it. If the player takes the Boon, he then chooses 3 cards (for 3-player mode) or 4 cards (for 4-player mode) to put face down into his points pile. These points count toward his score at the end of the round. Now all of the other players are on a defensive team against the solo player who took the Boon.

If a player chooses not to take the Boon, the opportunity passes to the next clockwise player who now has the same opportunity. This keeps repeating for all players until either someone takes the Boon or all players pass on it.
If nobody takes the Boon, the game goes into Leaster Mode.

Playing a Trick 
The player to the left of the dealer leads the first trick in a round by playing any card from his hand. The suit of the card played is called the leading suit for the remainder of the trick. Proceeding clockwise, each player plays a card face up in the middle of the table. Each player must follow suit, which means:
 If a player has one or more cards of the leading suit, he must play one of them.
 If a player does not have any cards of the leading suit, he can play any card in his hand.

Winning a Trick 
The trick ends after each player has played one card. The winner of the trick is:
 The person who played the highest ranked trump card if any trump cards are present.
 The person who played the highest ranked card of the leading suit if no trump cards are present.
The winner of the trick collects the cards played into a personal face down pile and proceeds to play the first card of the next trick. Tricks repeat until all players are out of cards, completing a round.

Winning a Round 
The round is over when all of the cards have been played. The two opposing sides – the solo player and the defensive team – are competing to win the most points out of the round’s 120 total possible points.
At the end of the round, each player adds up the point values on the cards he won – his personal face down pile. The solo player also adds the points from the cards he removed from his hand at the start of the round.
The defensive team adds their points together, then payouts are determined by the solo player’s score:
 If the solo player scores 0 - 29 points, he pays each defensive player 2 victory cards.
 If the solo player scores 30 - 60 points, he pays each defensive player 1 victory card.
 If the solo player scores 61 - 90 points, he collects 1 victory card from each defensive player.
 If the solo player scores 91 - 120 points, he collects 2 victory cards from each defensive player.

Winning the Game 
Rounds repeat until one player has lost all of his victory cards after payouts. You win the game if you are the player who has the most victory cards at this time!

Leaster Mode 
If all players decline to take the Boon, the round goes into Leaster Mode. Set the Boon cards aside entirely. Each player is on a team of his own. The goal is now to earn the fewest points possible, while still winning at least one trick. A player who does not win any tricks is disqualified from winning the round. At the end of the round, each player gives one victory card to the winner.

See also
Sheepshead
Skat
Doppelkopf
Ombre

References

External links
The official page for Boon: The Game

Dedicated deck card games
Trick-taking card games